This is a list of vice presidents of the Constitutional Court of Austria.  The vice president of the Constitutional Court is the principal deputy to the president. He becomes the acting head of the court if the president resigns, dies or is dismissed.

List of officeholders

See also
 Judiciary of Austria
 History of Austria
 Politics of Austria
 Supreme Court of Justice (Austria)

External links
 Members of the Constitutional Court

References 

Constitutional Court of Austria judges